Taylor County High School is a U.S. high school (grades 9 to 12) in the city of Campbellsville, Taylor County, Kentucky. It is one of two high schools in Campbellsville, the other being Campbellsville High School.

Band

The band participates in marching band contests sponsored by the Kentucky Music Educators Association, Bands of America, and the MidStates Band Association throughout the marching season. The band is under the direction of Stephen Bishop. The marching band has made five state finals appearances. On October 30, 2010, the band made history as they made it into state finals for the first time since 1992. They made third place in class 3A, which is the highest place ever made in the history of the band. Also, they received the second highest score ever given to the Taylor County Band for marching. The band also includes a concert band, which runs throughout the entire school year and a pep band, which performs at home games during the basketball and football seasons. They also participate at many community events throughout the year, most notably, the Christmas, Homecoming, and Fourth of July parades.

On November 5, 2011, The Taylor County Marching Cardinals Band won the Grand Champion in class AA in the Mid-States Band Association Championships competition held in Beavercreek Ohio, at Beavercreek High School. Since then the Taylor county marching cardinals have won Grand Champion in class AA in the Mid-states championships five consecutive years in a row (2014, 2015, 2016, 2017, 2018)

Choir
The school is also noted for its choir program, led by Stephen Bishop. Most notable is the Show Choir, which has performed at several high-profile locations around the country, including New York City, Boston, Chicago, and most recently Walt Disney World.

Athletics

The school competes in football, soccer, basketball, baseball, softball, volleyball, golf, swimming, tennis,  track and field, bowling, fishing, wrestling, and cross country, on the varsity levels. Taylor County High School has won three team sport, girls' bowling in 2013, boys' bowling in 2016, and boys' golf in 2018. J.B. Holmes won the KHSAA Boys' Individual Golf Championship in 1998. Taylor County High School won 1999 region football.

Notable faculty

Betty Jane Gorin-Smith, Kentucky historian

Notable alumni
 Clem Haskins, former NBA player and college basketball coach at University of Minnesota
 J. B. Holmes, PGA Tour golfer

References

External links
 Official site
 TCHS Football Web Site
 TCHS Band official web site

Public high schools in Kentucky
Schools in Taylor County, Kentucky
Campbellsville, Kentucky